David Frankfurter (9 July 1909 – 19 July 1982) was a Croatian Jew. He is known for having assassinated Swiss branch leader of the German NSDAP Wilhelm Gustloff in February 1936 in Davos, Switzerland.

Background, family and education
Frankfurter was born in Daruvar, Croatia (then part of the Austro-Hungarian Empire), to a Jewish family, father Mavro and mother Rebekka (née Figel) Frankfurter. His father was a rabbi in Daruvar and later the chief rabbi in Vinkovci, where the Frankfurter family relocated in 1914. Frankfurter was a sickly child and suffered an incurable periostitis for which he underwent seven operations between the ages of six and twenty-three; his doctors feared he would not live a normal lifespan. He graduated from elementary and later secondary school, in 1929, with high marks. After completing his basic education, he began studying medicine. His father sent him to Germany to study dentistry, first in Leipzig and then in 1931 in the town of his ancestors, Frankfurt.

Shooting of Gustloff
While studying in Germany, he witnessed the coming to power of the Nazis and the initiation of anti-semitic measures. The rise of Nazism in Germany and the banning of Jews from German universities compelled him to move to Switzerland to continue his studies, and he settled in Bern in 1934. There, among the Germans and German speaking Swiss, the Nazi movement gained ground, led by Wilhelm Gustloff. Having become convinced of the danger posed by the Nazis, Frankfurter kept an eye on Gustloff, head of the Foreign Section of the Nazi Party in Switzerland (NSDAP), who ordered the Protocols of the Elders of Zion to be published in Switzerland. In 1936, unable to endure the torrent of insults, humiliations and attacks on the Jewish people, of whom he was very proud, Frankfurter bought a gun in Bern. Frankfurter found Gustloff's address easily, as it was listed in the phonebook. On 4 February 1936, he went to the Gustloff home; Gustloff's wife, Hedwig Gustloff, received him and showed him into the study, asking him to wait since her husband was on the telephone but would be with him presently.

When Gustloff, who was in the adjoining room, entered his office where Frankfurter was sitting opposite a picture of Hitler, Frankfurter introduced himself as a Jew and then shot him five times in the head, neck and chest; he left the premises (according to Heinz Schön, while hearing Hedwig Gustloff's cries), went into the next house and asked to use the telephone. He rang the police and confessed to the murder. Immediately he went to the police station and calmly told the police what had happened. The assassination of Gustloff rang out through Europe, thanks to Nazi propaganda directed by Joseph Goebbels. But Adolf Hitler prohibited retaliation against the Jews at the time, fearing an international boycott of the winter and summer Olympics that were due to be held in Germany, through which he wanted to propagandise the size, power and ideology of the Nazi movement on a world stage. Gustloff was made a Blutzeuge/Blood Martyr of the Nazi cause and his assassination later became part of the propaganda serving as pretext, along with Herschel Grynszpan's assassination of German diplomat Ernst vom Rath, for the 1938 Kristallnacht pogrom.

Although the assassination was well received by the largely anti-Nazi population of the country, the Swiss government prosecuted the case strictly, owing to concerns about its status of neutrality. Frankfurter was convicted of the killing and sentenced to an eighteen-year prison term and subsequent expulsion from the country. His father visited his son in prison and asked him "who actually needed this?" In 1941, as the Nazis occupied Vinkovci, Frankfurter's father was forced to stand on a table while the German soldiers spat in his face, pulled out the hair from his long beard, and struck him with their rifle butts. Frankfurter's father was later killed by Ustaše in the Jasenovac concentration camp during the Holocaust.

As the Second World War came to an end, Frankfurter applied for a pardon on 27 February 1945, which was granted on 17 May, but he still had to leave the country and pay restitution and court costs. In 1969, the cantonal parliament of Graubünden revoked the expulsion.

Later years and emigration to Israel

After his release from prison, he had to leave Switzerland, and he travelled to the British Mandate of Palestine. Frankfurter settled in Tel Aviv. He later became an employee of the Israeli Minister of Defence and later an officer in the Israeli Army. He lived and worked in several Israeli cities until his death in 1982.

Death
Frankfurter died in Israel, in the city of Ramat Gan on 19 July 1982 aged 73.

Legacy
Several books were written about the Gustloff assassination. Frankfurter published two memoirs. The first in German called Rache ("revenge") and the second in English called The first fighter against Nazism. Frankfurter's assassination of Gustloff is also the subject of the 1975 Swiss film Assassination in Davos which gives an account of the events with much of the film devoted to the subsequent trial. The film ends with actual footage of David Frankfurter living in Israel.

In Israel, Frankfurter has been hailed as a hero, and after his death the streets of several cities and parks were named after him.

References

Further reading 
 Günter Grass's novel, where Frankfurter plays a large, symbolic part in the plot: Crabwalk, English 2003, 
 Peter Bollier, 4. Februar 1936: das Attentat auf Wilhelm Gustloff; in: Roland Aergerter (ed.), Politische Attentate des 20. Jahrhunderts, Zürich, NZZ Verlag, 1999
 Matthieu Gillabert, La propagande nazie en Suisse, L'affaire Gustloff 1936, Lausanne: Presses polytechniques et universitaires romandes, 2008
 Emil Ludwig; Peter O. Chotjewitz; Helmut Kreuzer (eds.), Der Mord in Davos, Herbstein: März, 1986
Heinz Schön Die Gustloff - Katastrophe. Bericht eines Überlebenden über die größte Schiffskatastrophe im Zweiten Weltkrieg. (The Gustloff Catastrophe: Account of a Survivor of the Biggest Ship Disaster in the Second World War.) Motorbuch Verlag, 2002,

External links 
 "Simon Wiesenthal Center" about David Frankfurter

Konfrontation at the Internet Movie Database.
 

1909 births
1982 deaths
1936 murders in Switzerland
People from Daruvar
People from the Kingdom of Croatia-Slavonia
Croatian Jews
Austro-Hungarian Jews
Croatian people of Czech-Jewish descent
Yugoslav emigrants to Mandatory Palestine
Israeli people of Croatian-Jewish descent
Israeli people of Czech-Jewish descent
People convicted of murder by Switzerland
Recipients of Swiss parliamentary pardons
Assassins